Diana Primrose (floruit 1630) was the author of a eulogy to the deceased Queen Elizabeth published as A Chaine of Pearle, Or a Memoriall of the peerles Graces, and Heroick Vertues of Queene Elizabeth of Glorious Memory. Composed by the Noble Lady, Diana Primrose (London, 1630). It is thought that this piece was written not only as a tribute to the 45-year reign of Elizabeth but as a criticism of the sometimes hot-headed King James, as well as a social criticism. The Chaine itself is made up of ten "Pearles" or short poems detailing virtues found in Elizabeth; some of these Pearles however are not qualities directly attributed to Elizabeth and thus it is considered that they may present a criticism of the then current ruler.

Some have contended that the poet used an allegorical pseudonym, the concordance between the goddess Diana (referred to in the text) and the author Diana presents an interesting conflict. Upon closer observation, the author's name itself is a tribute to Elizabeth Tudor. Diana as stated above often used as a symbol of Elizabeth and her fame as the virgin queen, Primrose being the flower of England. Elizabeth was often referred to as the rose of England, and as head of state that would make her the PRIME ROSE of England. Thus the primrose became a symbol of her monarchy. The symbolic nature of the author's name calls into question its potentiality for being a pen name. It is possible that the author used this name to add further emphasis on the queen, and that the real author is in fact another female writer of some renown. The Primrose family however, was well established; there is, however, no record of a "Diana". In 1805 John Nichols identified Anne Clifford as the author, but while there is some circumstantial evidence, nothing definitive has come to light, considering a conflict with recorded publishing date (Nichols attributes the publication to 1603 rather than 1630) A Chaine of Pearle takes the first part of William Camden's Annals of Queen Elizabeth (1615) as its source, as well as Spenser's Faerie Queene and listing, as it does, the virtues of Elizabeth I—the "pearles" of the title—it is generally considered to have been a pointed criticism of James I. The entire piece is constructed as though it were a chain of pearls, each separate poem another pearl on the chain that reflects Elizabeth's own beauty of character as both a woman and a ruler, devoid of gender; the pearls representing qualities such as "Chastity", "Religion", "Prudence", and "Temperance" (Spenser). Primrose however also uses other qualities not attributed to Elizabeth such as "Patience" opening the possibility of criticisms of either Elizabeth's predecessors or more likely her successor James I (Primrose, A Chaine of Pearle).

Works
A Chaine of Pearle, Or a Memoriall of the peerles Graces, and Heroick Vertues of Queene Elizabeth of Glorious Memory. Composed by the Noble Lady, Diana Primrose | Dat Rosa mel apibus, qua sugit Aranea virus. London: Printed for Thomas Paine, and are to be sold by Philip Waterhouse at his shop at the signe of St. Paul's-head in Canning Street neare London-stone, 1630.

The following is a short edition regarding "The Induction" to "A Chaine of Pearl", including footnotes, and specific to the symbology of the piece.

Wildly symbolic, this introduction to the longer A Chaine of Pearle by Diana Primrose was written to eulogise the deceased Queen Elizabeth the first, during the reign of James the sixth of Scotland (Castelli). It is thought that this piece was not only written as a tribute to the forty five-year reign of Elizabeth but as a criticism of the sometimes hot-headed King, as well as a social criticism. The Chaine itself is made up of ten Pearles or short poems detailing virtues that were found in Elizabeth, some of these Pearles however are not qualities directly attributed to Elizabeth and thus it is considered that they may present a criticism of the then current ruler.

The use of the metaphor of a pearl chain sets the tone for the eulogy and illustrates from the beginning the symbolic nature of the peace. The pearl is the oldest known gem, found in the sarcophagus of a Princess of Persia who died in 520 BC (Anonymous, Pearls in Human History). Since its discovery the pearl has been a symbol of purity and perfection and has been recognised as the gem of royalty due to each pearl's unique design no pearl being exactly the same; its formation also signifies strength of character (Anonymous, The Rich History of Pearls). Images of Elizabeth show that the pearl adorned many of her garments, found in the intricate embroidery of her gowns and worn in long ropes around her neck, even attached to pins worn in her hair, and it is assumed that it was her favourite gem in addition to being a symbol of her purity and virginity, they effectively became her robes of state. The entire piece is constructed as though it were a chain of pearls, each separate poem another pearl on the chain that reflects Elizabeth's own beauty of character as both a woman and a ruler, devoid of gender; the pearls representing qualities such as “Chastity”, “Religion”, “Prudence”, and “Temperance” (Spenser). Primrose however also uses other qualities not attributed to Elizabeth such as “Patience” opening the possibility of criticisms of either Elizabeth's predecessors or more likely her successor James VI (Primrose, A Chaine of Pearle).

It is here that the criticisms come into play more heavily. The regard that the people of England had for their Queen, transcended her gender, a fact exploited by Primrose in her blatant disregard for gender roles within her piece; By putting emphasis on sex as opposed to gender Primrose relies on the physical distinctions between men and women as opposed to societally imposed gender roles, roles which Elizabeth as an unmarried political ruler openly flouted. This carries over into “The Induction” of the piece itself as she compares Elizabeth to both male and female characters of classical Roman literature (Primrose, A Chaine of Pearle). Primrose uses the virgin queen as a reflection of the union between masculine and feminine natures. Beginning with a comparison to the Roman God of the sun Phoebus, and then to the Goddess of the moon and chastity, Diana (Anonymous, UNRV History). These comparisons unite in records of Elizabeth's nature, and show that she is equal in strength to men, and yet retains her feminine charms.

This edition includes only the opening two short pieces by Primrose, allowing the editor to focus on the emphasis of symbology evident throughout the entire piece, but most clear in “The Induction”.

A Chaine of Pearle
“To All Noble Ladies and Gentlewomen”
To you, the honour of our noble sex,
I send this chain with all my best respects,
Which if you please to wear for her  sweet sake,
For whom I did this slender poem make,
You shall erect a trophy to her name,
And crown yourselves with never-ending fame .

“The Induction”
As golden Phoebus  with his radiant face
Enthroned in his triumphant chair of state,
The twinkling stars and asterisms  doth chase
With his imperial scepter, and doth hate
All consorts in his starry monarchy
As prejudicial to his sovereignty,

Written for a female audience Primrose calls attention to women's ability to be involved in politics and offer criticisms similar to Elizabeth herself.
Primrose uses “sex” not “gender” implying and emphasis on the physical difference instead of societal conventions.
  Queen Elizabeth I
  Make yourselves more noticeable and strong by being more like the Queen.
  The Roman God of the Sun, implying a strength and power equal to that of men.
  Implying a comparison to Diana, Roman goddess of the moon.
  Implies equality between Phoebus and Diana and thus equality between men and women.

So great Eliza, England's brightest sun,
The world's renown and ever-lasting lamp,
Admits not here the least comparison,
Whose glories do the greatest princes damp,
That ever scepter swayed or crown did wear,
Within the verge of either hemisphere.
Thou English goddess, empress  of our sex,
O thou whose name still reigns in all our hearts,
To whom are due our ever-vow’d respects,
How shall I blazon  thy most royal parts?
Which in all parts did so divinely shine,
As they deserve Apollo's  quill (not mine).
Yet, since the gods accept the humble vows
Of mortals, deign, O thou star-crowned queen
T’accept these ill-composed pearly rows,
Wherein thy glory chiefly shall be seen;
For by these lines so black and impolite,
Thy swan-like lustre shall appear more white .
Thy imperial majesties eternal votary,
Diana

  lessen
  Role model for all women
  Emphasis on physical sex not conventional gender.
  Refers to great acts, and burning them in the memory of the world.
  Roman god of truth, implying the piece does not do the Queen justice.
  Gods accept the prayers of lesser beings, so should Elizabeth accept this praise.
  Hearkens back to the chain of pearls
  The poem is so much less than what she deserves that it appears blackened and ruinous beside her.
  The darkness of the poem in comparison to Elizabeth will make her seem even more royal and divine.
  The vows of a nun, implying the author is worshiping of Elizabeth. Also speaks to Elizabeth's devotion to her people, shown through her unmarried state.
  Shows devotion of both Author and the Goddess.

References

Resources
Greer, Germaine, et al., eds. "Diana Primrose." Kissing the Rod: an anthology of seventeenth-century women's verse. Farrar, Straus and Giroux, 1988. 83–89.
anonymous. "Diana Primrose." Dictionary of Literary Biography 2008: 1–9.
anonymous. "Given Names c.1450–1650." 2010. Ancestry.com. April 2010
Anonymous. "Pearls in Human History" 2010. American Museum of Natural History. April 2010
—. "The Rich History of Pearls" 2006. Pearl Oasis. April 2010
—. UNRV History. 2003–2010. April 2010 <>.

Hopkins, Lisa. Maids and Mistresses, Cousins and Queens: Women's Alliances in Early Modern England. Shakespeare Studies (2001).
Nichols, John. The Progresses and Public Processions of Queen Elizabeth. London: John Nichols and son, 1823.
Primrose, Diana. "A Chaine of Pearle". Wynne-Davies, Marion. Women Poets of the Renaissance. London: J.M. Dent, 1998. 229–238, 328–337.
Primrose, Diana. "A Chaine of Pearle". Helen Ostovich, Elizabeth Sauer. Reading Early Modern Women. London: Routledge, 2004. 380–381.
Spenser, Edmund. The Faerie Queen. 1590. Early English Books Online. 7 April 2010

External links

 http://0-eebo.chadwyck.com.library.albion.edu/search/full_rec?SOURCE=pgimages.cfg&ACTION=ByID&ID=99837015&FILE=../session/1272436265_14332&SEARCHSCREEN=CITATIONS&SEARCHCONFIG=var_spell.cfg&ECCO=N&DISPLAY=AUTHOR

17th-century English women writers
17th-century English writers
Cultural depictions of Elizabeth I
English women poets
Year of birth unknown
Year of death unknown